The women's volleyball tournament at the 1994 Asian Games was held from October 3 to October 7, 1994 in Hiroshima, Japan.

Results
All times are Japan Standard Time (UTC+09:00)

|}

Final standing

References
 Women's Results

External links
 Results

Women's volleyball